UST Essx, simply referred to as Essx is a brand of pole vaulting poles used by athletes for the competition. Essx is currently owned by UST Mamiya, a golf club manufacturer. Started in the mid 1990s by Bruce Caldwell, Essx gained notoriety as a major pole vaulting brand when their sponsored athlete Sam Kendricks made the list of the world's best pole vaulters.

Based in Fort Worth, Texas, Essx manufactures several vaulting poles and pole vault accessories. Their main line of pole, the Essx Recoil Advanced, has undergone several design changes over the past decade. As of 2019, top collegiate athletes have switched to vaulting on Essx poles.

History
Bruce Caldwell started ESSX Sport Corporation in 1998. His main goal was to sell pole vaulting poles that were different from the others on the market. By 2004, several world-class athletes were jumping with Essx poles. He teamed up with UST Mamiya in 2004 before selling the company outright to UST in 2016.

References

Pole vault
Companies based in Fort Worth, Texas